KEX (1190 kHz) is a clear channel AM radio station licensed to Portland, Oregon.  It is owned by iHeartMedia, Inc., and airs a news/talk format known as NewsRadio 1190.  The station's studios and offices are on SW 68th Parkway, off Interstate 5 in Tigard, Oregon.

Because KEX is a 50,000-watt Class A station, it reaches all of the Portland metropolitan area and beyond, providing grade B coverage as far south as Corvallis and as far east as The Dalles. At night, KEX can be heard around the Western United States and Western Canada. The transmitter is located off SE Lawnfield Road in Sunnyside. It uses a non-directional antenna in the daytime, but at night, to protect other stations on 1190 AM, it switches to a directional antenna with a three-tower array.

Programming
KEX mostly airs nationally syndicated talk shows, largely from Premiere Networks, a subsidiary of iHeartMedia, including Armstrong & Getty from co-owned KSTE in Sacramento; The Clay Travis and Buck Sexton Show; The Jesse Kelly Show; The Michael Berry Show from co-owned KTRH Houston; The Glenn Beck Program and Coast to Coast AM with George Noory. One local weekday show with Mark Mason is heard from noon to 3 p.m.  An hour of Mason's show is repeated at 5 a.m.

Weekends feature shows on money, cars, computers and home repair, as well as repeats of some weekday shows and some paid brokered programming.  Syndicated shows heard on weekends include Digital Goddess Kim Komando, Bill Handel on the Law, At Home with Gary Sullivan and Sunday Night Live with Bill Cunningham.

KATU Channel 2, the ABC television affiliate in Portland, supplies local news and weather. ABC Radio News is heard at the beginning of most hours with some news and sports reports from NBC News Radio also heard.  Bloomberg Radio provides business news updates.

The radio station holds no relation to the KEX Hotel, an Icelandic-owned hotel in downtown Portland.

History

Blue Network

On , KEX first signed on the air. Some sources show that the station may have originally started broadcasting on 670 kHz. On November 11, 1928, KEX started transmitting on 1180 kHz under the terms of the Federal Radio Commission's General Order 40. On March 29, 1941, the station moved to 1190 kHz under the terms of the North American Regional Broadcasting Agreement (NARBA).

KEX was an NBC Blue Network affiliate, carrying its schedule of dramas, comedies, news, sports, game shows, soap operas and big band broadcasts during the "Golden Age of Radio." In 1945, as the Blue Network became ABC Radio, KEX's affiliation continued. KEX was the first station to give the voice of Bugs Bunny, Mel Blanc, his own show. Blanc's Cobwebs & Nuts program debuted June 15, 1933, and ran Monday through Saturday from 11 p.m. to midnight.

The Oregonian and Westinghouse
The Oregonian Publishing Company, which owned The Morning Oregonian newspaper, acquired KEX in 1933. From 1934 to 1943, the station's studios were located in The Oregonian Building, in space shared with co-owned KGW, now KPOJ, which was the NBC Red Network affiliate in Portland. Westinghouse Broadcasting expanded to the West Coast in 1944 with its purchase of KEX, then running 5,000 watts, and sharing its frequency with another Westinghouse station, WOWO in Fort Wayne, Indiana.

In 1948, Westinghouse got the Federal Communications Commission (FCC) to increase KEX's power to 50,000 watts, day and night. Also in 1948, Westinghouse put KEX-FM on the air at 92.3 MHz (the frequency is now utilized by KGON). KEX-FM simulcast most of KEX's schedule. But few people had FM radios in those days and KEX-FM was taken off the air in the early 1960s. Also in the early 1960s, as network programming shifted from radio to television, KEX began airing a mix of middle of the road music, talk, news and sports.

Gene Autry and Clear Channel
Having reached the FCC's then-limit of seven AM stations, Westinghouse sold KEX to actor and singer Gene Autry's media company, Golden West Broadcasters, in 1967. In 1984, KEX was acquired by Taft Broadcasting. Taft became Citicasters in 1993, which was merged into Clear Channel Communications in 1999. Clear Channel was the forerunner to current owner iHeartMedia, Inc. As music listening switched to FM radio stations, KEX cut back on the songs it played till it became a true talk station by the late 1990s.

On March 30, 2011, KEX began simulcasting on FM once again, using translator station K272EL at 102.3 MHz. It also could be heard on the HD2 subchannel of co-owned KKRZ. The addition of K272EL was in response to rival news/talk outlet KXL's move from 750 AM to 101.1 FM. On September 9, 2013, KEX's FM simulcast ended, with KKRZ-HD2 and K272EL switching to an alternative rock format, branded as "Radio 102.3".  In 2021, KEX was once again heard on a local HD subchannel, on KLTH-HD2 at 106.7 MHz.

Sports
KEX became the flagship station of the Oregon State Beavers for the 2012-2013 season. 

Until 2013, KEX was the flagship station of the NBA Portland Trail Blazers.  In the event of a conflict with the Beavers, Blazers broadcasts were moved to sister station AM 620 KPOJ. The Blazers moved to KPOJ entirely in 2013.

Past personalities
Bill Adams – sportscaster (1937–39)
Barney Keep – morning show (1944–79)
Paul Linnman – morning show (2003–14)

References

External links 
1190 KEX website

Portland Area Radio Council
FCC History Cards for KEX

EX
News and talk radio stations in the United States
Radio stations established in 1926
1926 establishments in Oregon
Westinghouse Broadcasting
The Oregonian
IHeartMedia radio stations
Clear-channel radio stations